Ndahiro is a Rwandan name. Notable people by that name include:

 Emmanuel Ndahiro, chief of the intelligence agency of Rwanda until 2011.
 Ndahiro II Cyamatare, Mwami of the Kingdom of Rwanda at the end of the fifteenth century and father to Ruganzu II Ndoli.

Rwandan culture